Christopher William Long  (born 9 April 1938) is a former British diplomat. Following his retirement in 1998, Long served as director of the Oxford University Foreign Service Programme from 1999 to 2003.

Diplomatic career
Christopher Long joined HM Diplomatic Service as Third Secretary in 1963, and went to study Arabic at MECAS in the Lebanon in 1964. He was posted as Third Secretary later Second Secretary to Jedda in 1965, and two years later was posted as First Secretary to Caracas. He returned to the FCO in London in 1969. He became Head of Chancery in Budapest in 1974 and attended the Belgrade CSCE Meeting in 1977. Long was posted as Counsellor to Damascus in 1978, and to UKMIS Geneva in 1980. He was appointed Head of the FCO's Near East and North Africa Department in 1983. He became Assistant Under-Secretary of State (concurrently Deputy Chief Clerk and Chief Inspector) in the FCO in 1985. Long served as the United Kingdom's Ambassador to Switzerland (1988–1992), Egypt (1992–1995) and Hungary (1995–1998).

Post retirement
He has been a Director of Gedeon Richter Ltd., the largest pharmaceutical factory in Hungary, since 1998 and is also a trustee of The Orders of St John Care Trust.

Family
Long married Patricia Ann Eleanor Stanbridge in 1972. They had one daughter (1974) and two sons (1977 and 1982).

References

1938 births
Ambassadors of the United Kingdom to Hungary
Ambassadors of the United Kingdom to Switzerland
Ambassadors of the United Kingdom to Egypt
Companions of the Order of St Michael and St George
Living people
Members of HM Diplomatic Service
20th-century British diplomats